The Lahore College for Women University (LCWU) Is a public university in Lahore, Punjab, Pakistan. Founded in 1922 with a capacity of 60 students, it now has a full-time enrollment of about 15,000 students and admits students at Intermediate, Graduate, Masters and Ph.D. levels.

At the time of autonomy, in 1990, there were master's classes in only six areas. But now with the University status, LCWU offers degrees at graduate, postgraduate and doctoral levels. BS 4-year degree program is being offered in 39 disciplines and 5 years Pharm-D and Architecture degree is being offered. The college is offering M.A./M.Sc. in 6 subjects and M.S./M.Phil. degree in 28 subjects. The University is also offering Ph.D. programs in 16 disciplines i.e., Chemistry, Biotechnology, Botany, Zoology, Computer Science, City & Regional Planning, Mathematics, Environmental Science, Physics, Political Science, Education, Applied Psychology, Islamic Studies, urdu, Punjabi and Fine Arts.

Lahore College for Women University was established as an intermediate residential college, and was originally housed in a building on Hall Road, Lahore, with a capacity of 60 students (25 boarders) and 13 staff members. By 1950, College capacity had increased to 600 students and was shifted to the present building on Jail Road in Lahore. LCWU by 1922 was affiliated with the University of the Punjab for undergraduate program in 18 subjects. Within the next two years the institution had graduate programs in 14 subjects. Post graduate classes in English were initiated in 1940 and Honors classes in five subjects were introduced in 1949. B.Sc. classes started in 1955 while post-graduate classes in the subjects of Economics and Physics started in 1966. By 1979 Islamic Studies, Political Science and Psychology were also added to the ever-increasing list of programs.

The year 1990, when Administrative and Financial Autonomy was given to the institution, proved to be the turning point in the history of LCWU. On 13 August 1999, it was declared a Degree-Awarding institution. The institution was elevated to the status of a Women University on 10 September 2002.
The 21st century has brought a drastic revolution in science, which has completely transformed the world. Today sciences are exploring areas that defy imagination. Keeping in line with the importance of the sciences in today's world, LCWU has been fulfilling the demand of the female students in the area, as this was the only institution offering science subjects at undergraduate level. This is evident from the fact that majority of the female doctors, serving and retired, have at some stage (F.Sc. or B.Sc.) studied at Lahore College for Women. Since 1922 the college has proved its worth as the highest seat of learning for science subjects. At the moment Botany, Chemistry, Physics, Zoology, Bio-Technology, Mathematics, Economics, Statistics, Electronics, Environmental Science, Computer Science and Pharmacy are taught at Graduate, Postgraduate and Doctoral levels.

LCWU is cognizant of the significance of social sciences and liberal arts since they contribute to the aesthetic sense of human beings and are essential for the society. The Department of English, being more than 70 years old, is the oldest post-graduate department of the University. Founded by Prof Mrs. U.K. Siraj-ud-Din, it still is rooted in the traditions of scholarship and academic excellence. Besides English, Urdu, Punjabi, Islamic Studies, International Relations, Political Science, Fine Arts, Pakistan Studies, Mass Communication and Gender and Development Studies are being offered at graduate and postgraduate level. The graduates of LCWU take their place in moral, intellectual and professional leadership in all walks of national life.

Among its alumni are an extra ordinary number of teachers, physicians and professionals in all fields of life. At F.A./F.Sc. level the Intermediate College of LCWU is affiliated with the Board of Intermediate and Secondary Education, Lahore for the purpose of examinations. This Intermediate College has proved to be a very fruitful nursery in providing women force for professional education in the province.

Since the establishment of LCWU as a university, the institution has striven for improvement in Higher Education. MoU with various national industries and linkages with Foreign Universities have been established in the field of Pharmacy, Electronics, Environmental Science, Fine Arts, Economics, Mass Communication and Gender & Development Studies. Department of Software Engineering was established in year 2021 and Dr. Muhammad Mohsin Nazir was appointed as founding chairperson.

Current Vice Chancellor - Prof. Dr. Bushra Mirza T.I
Prof. Dr. Bushra Mirza is the current Vice Chancellor of LCWU. She took over the charge of the office of Vice Chancellor on 5th July 2019.

Dr. Bushra Mirza obtained both of her M. Sc and M. Phil degrees with distinction from Quaid-i-Azam University. After completing her Ph. D from the University of Cambridge, on Cambridge Commonwealth Scholarship, she did a short post-doc from the University of North Carolina, USA. She remained a regular faculty member of Quaid-i-Azam University since 1999 till 2019 when she joined Lahore College Women University as Vice Chancellor. During this period, she has been working on several research projects. She pioneered the establishment of research laboratory to produce transgenic plants, in Quaid-i-Azam University. Her research interests include evaluation of medicinal activity of various plants and their genetic transformation for improvement. She has also been involved in analyzing medicinal activities of newly synthesized compounds. 

Twenty two PhD and 120 M. Phil students have completed their research work successfully under her supervision. She has published more than 180 papers in the refereed journals of international repute with total impact factor and citation more than 300 and 2000 respectively. Apart from lab work, she has been interested in the bioethical aspect of Biotechnology as well and has been working at various levels in this regard. In 2001, she represented Pakistan at Salzberg Seminar “Biotechnology: Legal, ethical and moral issues” held at Salzburg, Austria. As a consequence of that seminar, she contributed to a book entitled “Cross Cultural Biotechnology” published by Rowman & Littlefield Publishers, Inc. Maryland, USA in 2004.  

In 2013, she was awarded an honorary position of ISESCO Women Science Chair. In this regard she has organized several events especially for the female scientists working in OIC countries. In 2017 she participated in the joint meeting of presidents of ISESCO Women Science Chairs at ISESCO’s Headquarters, Rabat, to develop a roadmap for promotion of science and technology by focusing on contribution of females in the region. Furthermore, she has been involved in volunteer work as well in different capacities. She has been coordinating at national level for High School Summer Science Research Program aimed to help high school students develop research aptitude. Besides, she is a member of several international forums like UNESCO-IFAP National Committee, Global Biodiversity & Health Big Data Alliance and executive member of the National Chapter of the Organization of Women Scientists of Developing World (OWSD).

As recognition of her research achievements, she was awarded Best Young Research Scholar Award (2006) by Higher Education Commission, Pakistan, gold medal for Biochemistry in the Year 2008 by Pakistan Academy of Sciences and Prof. A. R. Shakoori Gold Medal by the Zoology Society of Pakistan in 2010. Best Research Paper Award, by Higher Education Commission and Presidential Award Tamgha-i-Imtiaz in 2017

Memoranda of understanding
MoUs with national industries and links with foreign universities have been established in the fields of Pharmacy, Electrical Engineering, Environmental Science, Fine Arts, Economics, Mass Communication and architecture.

Research
Lahore College for Women University has established a Research Center to provide students with facilities and services for advance research.

Quality enhancement cell
 
A higher education institution needs quality benchmarks in its key performance areas. To institutionalize the process of quality control, the Quality Assurance Agency (QAA) has been established in the HEC.

In pursuit of the National Action Plan for performance evaluation, assessment and accreditation of institutions of higher education, a Quality Enhancement Cell was established in Lahore College for Women University.

Libraries

HEC Digital Library
HEC Digital Library is a program to provide researchers at public and private universities in Pakistan and non-profit research and development organizations with access to international scholarly literature based on electronic (online) delivery.

University Library
The main library of the university (Sciences, Computer Science and Arts) stocks books, magazines and publications as well as national newspapers.

Besides the main library there are seminar libraries in the post-graduate departments

Book bank
There is a book bank maintained by the Social Work Department. Deserving and needy students are provided with textbooks.

Student activities
 
To facilitate co-curricular activities and sports, there are student societies and clubs. Presidents and secretaries of these societies are nominated by the teachers. By participating in these activities the students win prizes. The Shaukat Ara Niazi Gold Medal is awarded to students on the basis of best performance in literary pursuits.

  'Botanical and Horticultural Society established by Dept. of Botany in 2013, holding  interuniversity events with perspectives of Plant Sciences. Bazzm-e- Mushaira's develops literary and poetic ability among students by arranging poetry events and competitions. Inter-university functions and competitions are arranged
 Comptech Society is a platform for the student of Computer Science Department to incorporate their extracurricular activities. Students from BS-CS, MS-CS and MIT share their views and arrange events.
 The  Economics Society arranges seminars, workshops, quiz competitions and essay competitions.
 The English Debating Society allows students to present their views, building confidence and oratorical skills.
 The Geography Society objective is to enhance student's capabilities, enhance their knowledge, build confidence among students and promote teamwork
 The Home Economics Society organizes workshops and competitions.
 Iqbal Society (departments of Philosophy and Persian) organize Iqbal Day programs, workshops and seminars highlighting the thought and philosophy of Iqbal.
 The Psychology Society has been revived and the members to be elected are interviewed. The society arranges events like workshops, seminars, conferences and lectures.
 The Punjabi Debating Society arranges inter-class and intercollegiate debates competitions and prepares students of LCWU to participate in debating competitions in other colleges and universities.
 The Shaukat Ara Niazi English Literary Society is named after Shaukat Ara Niazi, a faculty member of the English Department. The society arranges events, quizzes and essay writing competitions to polish students in literary activities.
 LCWU's Sports Society is under the department of Physical Education.
 The Statistics Society arranges seminars, workshops, quiz competitions and essay competitions.
 The Urdu Debating Society deals with debate declamation and speeches.
 Under the Urdu Literary Society (Halqa-e-Ehel-e-Qalam)''' students participate in essay writing competitions at a national level. College- and university-level essay writing competitions are arranged to promote students in literary activities.

Notable alumni

Bushra Ansari
Diana Baig
Samina Khalid Ghurki
Saba Hameed
Salima Hashmi
Farhat Hashmi
Riffat Hassan
Kishwar Naheed
Maryam Nawaz
Anusha Rahman
Manmohini Zutshi Sahgal
Arfa Sayeda Zehra

See also 
Women's colleges
List of educational institutions in Lahore
List of current and historical women's universities and colleges

References

External links
LCWU official website

Women's universities and colleges in Pakistan
Universities and colleges in Lahore
Educational institutions established in 1922
Lahore College for Women University
1922 establishments in British India
Engineering universities and colleges in Pakistan
Public universities and colleges in Punjab, Pakistan
Lahore
Lahore District